"Jet" is a song by Paul McCartney and Wings from their third studio album Band on the Run (1973). It was the first British and American single to be released from the album. The song's title was inspired by the name of a pony Paul came across while writing the song on a farm in Scotland.

The song peaked at number 7 on both the British and American charts on 30 March 1974, also charting in multiple countries in Europe. It has since been released on numerous compilation albums, and has since become one of the band's best-known tracks.

Background
Reviewers have reported that the song's title was inspired by the McCartneys' Labrador Retriever dog named "Jet". McCartney has substantiated this claim:

Also confirmed by an interview with Paul Gambaccini, broadcast on BBC Radio in December 1978,

However, in a 2010 interview on the UK television channel ITV1 for the programme Wings: Band on the Run (to promote the November 2010 CD/DVD re-release of the album) McCartney said that Jet was the name of a pony he had owned, although many of the lyrics bore little relation to the subject; indeed, the true meaning of the lyrics has defied all attempts at decryption.

In a 2017 interview on Australian radio station Triple J for the segment Take 5, McCartney said that the song was actually about his experience meeting Linda's father:

Recording
Whereas most of the Band on the Run album was recorded in Lagos, Nigeria, "Jet" was recorded entirely at Abbey Road Studios in London after the group's return (according to engineer Geoff Emerick in his book Here There and Everywhere). Instrumentation used in the song includes electric guitars, bass, Moog, drums, piano, horns and strings. A closer listening reveals the Moog is used for the bass line during the verse and is simply Linda holding the root note.

Release and reception
"Jet" was released as the debut single from Band on the Run in January 1974 (although in some countries, the Non-UK/US single "Mrs. Vandebilt" was released first). The single was backed with "Let Me Roll It" in Britain. When first released in America, the single's B-side was "Mamunia," another track from Band on the Run, but it was soon replaced with the British B-side.

The single was a Top 10 hit for Paul McCartney and Wings. It peaked at number 7 on both the British and American charts on 30 March 1974, and charted in multiple countries in Europe. "Jet" has since been released on multiple compilation albums, including Wings Greatest (1978), All the Best! (1987), Wingspan: Hits and History (2001) and Pure McCartney (2016).

Prominent music critic Dave Marsh named the song number 793 in his list of the 1001 greatest singles ever made. He referred to it as a "grand pop confection" that represented the only time McCartney approached the "drive and density" of his tenure with the Beatles. Writer Graham Reid has described it as a power pop "gem."  Billboard said that the "guitar energy" and vocal performances generate "an outstanding production."  Cash Box called it a "catchy number" with "distinctive guitar riffs," a "straightforward rock beat" and "provocative lyrics." Record World called it "an overpowering smash both vocally and instrumentally."

Paul McCartney was quoted in Clash magazine that the soft rock band The Carpenters were fans of "Jet":

The Australian rock band Jet drew their name from the song title.

Cover versions
Japanese pop power trio Shonen Knife's cover of this song is the last track on their 2008 album Super Group. Group member Naoko Yamano said that she picked the song since she is a longtime fan of McCartney.

The song was also covered live by American rock band Jellyfish, and the recording was included in their 1991 EP Jellyfish Comes Alive.

Personnel
Paul McCartney – lead vocals, guitar, bass guitar, drums, piano
Linda McCartney – backing vocals, Moog synthesizer
Denny Laine – backing vocals, guitar
Howie Casey – saxophone
(Jet One Hand Clapping) 
Paul McCartney – lead vocals, bass guitar
Linda McCartney – backing vocals, keyboards
Denny Laine – backing vocals, guitar
Jimmy McCulloch – lead guitar 
Howie Casey – saxophone
Geoff Britton – drums
(Jet Wings Over America)
Paul McCartney – lead vocals, bass guitar
Linda McCartney – backing vocals, keyboards
Denny Laine – backing vocals, guitar
Jimmy McCulloch – lead guitar 
Tony Dorsey – trombone, percussion
Howie Casey – saxophone, percussion
Steve Howard – trumpet, flugelhorn
Thaddeus Richard – saxophone
Joe English – drums

Charts

Weekly charts

Year-end charts

References

External links
 

1973 songs
1974 singles
Apple Records singles
British power pop songs
Deram Records singles
Music published by MPL Music Publishing
Paul McCartney songs
Song recordings produced by Paul McCartney
Songs written by Linda McCartney
Songs written by Paul McCartney
Paul McCartney and Wings songs
Glam rock songs